Acratosaura spinosa, the spiny colobosaura, is a species of lizard in the family Gymnophthalmidae. It is endemic to Brazil.

References

Acratosaura
Reptiles described in 2009
Taxa named by Miguel Trefaut Rodrigues
Taxa named by José Cassimiro
Taxa named by Marco A. de Freitas
Taxa named by Thais F. Santos Silva